Li Xue (born 14 April 1985) is a Chinese-born French table tennis player. She has competed for France at the 2012 and 2016 Summer Olympics.

References

Chinese emigrants to France
French female table tennis players
Table tennis players at the 2012 Summer Olympics
Table tennis players at the 2016 Summer Olympics
Olympic table tennis players of France
1985 births
Living people
European Games competitors for France
Table tennis players at the 2015 European Games
Mediterranean Games silver medalists for France
Competitors at the 2009 Mediterranean Games
Competitors at the 2013 Mediterranean Games
Universiade medalists in table tennis
Sportspeople from Zibo
Table tennis players from Shandong
People who lost Chinese citizenship
Naturalised table tennis players
Naturalized citizens of France
Mediterranean Games medalists in table tennis
Universiade bronze medalists for France
Medalists at the 2009 Summer Universiade